Gennadiy Dakshevich (Russian: Геннадий Дакшевич; born 15 March 1966) is a retired hurdler who represented the Soviet Union and later Russia. He competed at two World Championships, in 1991 and 1995.

His personal bests are 13.55 seconds in the 110 metres hurdles (Kiev 1993) and 7.59 seconds in the 60 metres hurdles (Moscow 1995).

International competitions

References

Living people
1966 births
Soviet male hurdlers
Russian male hurdlers
World Athletics Championships athletes for Russia
World Athletics Championships athletes for the Soviet Union
Russian Athletics Championships winners